During the Trans-Saharan slave trade, slaves were transported across the Sahara desert. Most were moved from Sub-Saharan Africa to North Africa to be sold to Mediterranean and Middle Eastern civilizations; a small percentage went the other direction. Estimates of the total number of black slaves moved from Sub-Saharan Africa to the Muslim world range from 11-17 million, and the trans-Saharan trade routes conveyed a significant number of this total, with one estimate tallying around 7.2 million slaves crossing the Sahara from the mid-7th century until the 20th century.

Early trans-Saharan slave trade 
Records of slave trading and transportation in the Sahara date back as far as the 3rd millennium BC during the reign of the Egyptian king Sneferu who crossed the fourth cataract of the Nile into what is today modern Sudan to capture slaves and send them north. These raids for prisoners of war, who subsequently became slaves, were a regular occurrence in the ancient Nile Valley and Africa. During times of conquest and after winning battles, the ancient Nubians were taken as slaves by the ancient Egyptians .

The Garamantes relied heavily on slave labor from sub-Saharan Africa. They used slaves in their own communities to construct and maintain underground irrigation systems known to Berbers as foggara. Ancient Greek historian Herodotus recorded in the 5th century BC that the Garamantes enslaved cave-dwelling Ethiopians, known as Troglodytae, chasing them with chariots.

In the early Roman Empire, the city of Lepcis established a slave market to buy and sell slaves from the Bantu African interior. In the 5th century AD, Roman Carthage was trading in black slaves brought across the Sahara. The empire imposed customs tax on the trade of slaves. Black slaves seem to have been valued as household slaves for their exotic appearance. Some historians argue that the scale of slave trade in this period may have been higher than medieval times due to the high demand for slaves in the Roman Empire. However the slave trade through the Sahara in antiquity may have been small and rare as Saharan trade didn't reach large dimensions until the Arabs and Berbers introduced large numbers of camels into the desert.

Trans-Saharan slave trade in the Middle Ages 

Paul Lovejoy estimates that around 6 million black slaves were transported across the Sahara between the years 650 AD and 1500 AD. The trans-Saharan slave trade, established in Antiquity, continued during the Middle Ages. Following the early 8th-century conquest of North Africa, Arabs, Berbers, and other ethnic groups ventured into Sub-Saharan Africa first along the Nile Valley towards Nubia, and also across the Sahara towards West Africa. They were interested in the trans-Saharan trade, especially in slaves, as there was a constant demand for slaves in the eastern Arab nations and Constantinople. The Muslim slave traders distinguished themselves from the peoples on the other side of the Sahara, referring to these African populations as Zanj or Sudan meaning "black". Arabs would routinely acquire slaves through violent raiding, followed by capturing them and sending them on dangerous forced marches across the Sahara to slave markets where they would be treated as chattel i.e. as personal property that can be bought and sold. In North Africa, the main slave markets were in Morocco, Algiers, Tripoli and Cairo. Sales were held in public places such as souks.

Aside from raiding, slaves could also be obtained by purchasing them from local black rulers. The 9th century Arab historian Ya'qubi states:
Indeed it was rare that African rulers would resist the slave trade and usually they would act as middlemen, rounding up members of nearby villages to be sold to visiting merchants. The 12th century Arab geographer al-Idrisi noted that black Africans would also participate in slave raiding stating that:

Al-Idrisi would also describe the different methods Muslim merchants would use to enslave blacks, recording that some would "steal the children of the Zanj using dates...lure them with dates and lead them from place to place, until they seize them, take them out of the country and transport them to their own countries". In 1353 the Berber explorer Ibn Battuta would record accompanying a trade caravan to Morocco which carried 600 black female slaves who were to be used as domestic servants and concubines. When Battuta visited the ancient African kingdom of Mali he recounted that the local inhabitants vied with each other in the number of slaves and servants they had, and was himself given a slave boy as a "hospitality gift."

The routes taken by slave caravans transporting slaves depended on their destination. Slaves headed to Egypt would be carried by boat down the Nile and slaves headed to Arabia would be sent to ports on the Red Sea such as Suakin and Assab. Slaves headed to North Africa would have to take the Saharan trade routes which had been in use since around 1000 BC. These include routes such as the ones from Tripoli-Ghadames-Ghat-Hoggar-Gao connecting modern day Libya to Nigeria, the Tripoli-Fezzan-Bornu route, connecting Libya to areas of what are today Chad, Niger, and Cameroon, and the east-west route connecting Egypt to Ghana, Mali, and Songhai. Kanem-Bornu-Zawila was another route to North Africa as the Kanem–Bornu Empire in the eastern part of Niger was an active part of the trans-Saharan slave trade for centuries, and the trade formed the basis of the empire's prosperity.

Passage through the Sahara required the expertise of ethnic groups whose lifestyles were uniquely adapted for survival in scorching, arid environments, namely the local Berber tribes and the foreign Bedouins from Arabia. For example, the Tuareg and others who are indigenous to Libya facilitated, taxed and partly organized the trade from the south along the trans-Saharan trade routes. These various nomadic peoples were also critical as the guards, guides, and camel drivers, who aided the trade caravans and resultingly they were granted autonomy and treated as allies by governments of North Africa. Oases were vital waystations for caravans and those such as Awjila, Ghadames, and Kufra in Libya allowed both north-south and east-west travel. Even with expert help the passage could still prove deadly to merchants and slaves.  Sometimes whole caravans of thousands of people could disappear without a trace.

The goods exchanged in the Trans-Saharan slave trade varied. In the 10th century, the Muslim scholar Mutahhar ibn Tahir al-Maqdisi described the trade between the Islamic world and Africa as consisting of food and clothing being imported into Africa while slaves, gold, and coconuts were exported out of Africa. Later the 16th century Andalusian writer Leo Africanus wrote that traders from Morocco would bring horses, European cloth, clothing, sugar, books, and brass vessels to Sudan in order to exchange them for slaves, civets and gold. According to Africanus, the sultan of Bornu would accept payment for slaves only in horses, with an exchange rate of up to one slave per twenty horses.

The range of tasks given to slaves was varied and included servile labor utilized for "irrigation, pastoralism, mining, transport, public works, proto-industry, and construction." In general black slaves were used as laborers, servants and eunuchs. Some female slaves could be used for labor, but most would be used for domestic chores and concubinage. Eunuchs, who were around seven times more expensive than non-castrated males due to their rarity, could be used as harem guards, administrators, tutor, secretaries, commercial agents, and even concubines. Due to strictures within Islamic Law slaves would not usually be castrated within Muslim territory and therefore would be castrated before being sent across the Sahara, although sometimes slaves were castrated after purchase in North African slave markets. Conditions within the mining industry were notoriously harsh especially the salt mines of Basra where tens of thousands of black slaves toiled in extremely miserable conditions living on insufficient amounts of food. This poor treatment led to the bloody Zanj Rebellion or "black revolution". Ya'qubi records that both male and female slaves were employed in the copper mines of Upper Egypt. The Carmarthian Republic of eastern Arabia is said to have employed 30,000 blacks slaves to perform all difficult labor. Some black slaves served in the military forces of North Africa. For example the Zirid Dynasty used black slaves imported from Sudan via Zawila.

In some instances, Christians in Africa would acquiesce to Muslims demands that they be provided with slaves. In 641 AD during the treaty known as the Baqt was signed establishing an agreement between the Nubian Christian state of Makuria and the new Muslim rulers of Egypt, in which the Nubians agreed to give Muslim traders more privileges of trade in addition to sending 442 slaves every year to Cairo as tribute. This treaty remained intact for 600 years all while the slave trade within Nubia continued unimpeded.  

In the Muslim culture of the middle ages blackness became increasingly identified with slavery. This was justified by appeals to a specific interpretation of the biblical story of Curse of Ham that posited Ham had been cursed by Noah in two ways, the first, the turning of his skin black, and the second, that his descendants would be doomed to slavery. Muslim slave traders would use this as a pretext to enslave blacks, including black Muslims. In the late 14th century a black king of Bornu wrote a letter to the sultan of Egypt complaining of the continual slave raids perpetrated by Arab tribesmen, which were devastating his lands and resulting in the mass enslavement of the black Muslim population of the region. In Al-Andalus, the area of medieval Iberia under Islamic control, black Muslims could be legally held as slaves. This all occurred despite the orthodox Muslim jurist position that no Muslim, regardless of race, could be enslaved. Even as late as the 19th century many of the common people in Islamic society still believed that enslavement based on skin color, rather than based on religion, was approved by the religious laws of Islam.

In 1416, al-Maqrizi told how pilgrims coming from Takrur (near the Senegal River) brought 1,700 slaves with them to Mecca. In the late 16th century access to slaves in the areas of the former Songhai Empire in West Africa were cut off due to the anarchy in the area caused by the Moroccan armies' invasion of Songhai headed by al-Mansur. This necessitated the substitution of the former Songhai route with the Benghazi-Wadai route and others through Sudan.  After Europeans had settled in the Gulf of Guinea, the trans-Saharan slave trade became less important.

Arabs were sometimes made into slaves in the trans-Saharan slave trade. Sometimes castration was done on Arab slaves. In Mecca, Arab women were sold as slaves according to Ibn Butlan, and certain rulers in West Africa had slave girls of Arab origin. According to al-Maqrizi, slave girls with lighter skin were sold to West Africans on hajj. Ibn Battuta met an Arab slave girl near Timbuktu in Mali in 1353. Battuta wrote that the slave girl was fluent in Arabic, from Damascus, and her master's name was Farbá Sulaymán. Besides his Damascus slave girl and a secretary fluent in Arabic, Arabic was also understood by Farbá himself. The West African states also imported highly trained slave soldiers.

Under the Saadi dynasty, Morocco's sugar industry was dependent on black African slave labor. According to Paul Berthier, the need for slave labor on Moroccan sugar plantations was a major reason for the 17th century Saadian invasion of the Songhai Empire.

Late trans-Saharan slave trade 

In Central Africa during the 16th and 17th centuries, slave traders continued to raid the region as part of the expansion of the Saharan and Nile River slave routes. It is estimated that, in the 17th and 18th centuries, 1.4 million slaves were compelled to make the trek through the Sahara   Captives were enslaved and shipped to the Mediterranean coast, Europe, Arabia, the Western Hemisphere, or to the slave ports and factories along the West and North Africa coasts or South along the Ubanqui and Congo rivers.

1.2 million slaves are estimated to have been sent through the Sahara in the 19th century. In the 1830s, a period when slave trade flourished, Ghadames was handling 2,500 slaves a year. Even though the slave trade was officially abolished in Tripoli in 1853, in practice it continued until the 1890s. One witness to the behavior of the slave dealers, G.F. Lyon, described their behavior in Libya thusly:
 In Tripoli Lyon recorded that from 4,000 to 5,000 slaves were processed annually with slaves raids to areas like Kanem-Bornu providing sources of captives.

Other 19th century European explorers also recorded their perilous experiences traveling through the deadly Saharan Desert alongside slave caravans. The explorer Gustav Nachtigal reported finding numerous bones at desert springs that had run dry. Nachtigal estimated that for every one slave that successfully arrived at the market three or four had either died or escaped. Cold could also kill in the desert as the explorer Heinrich Barth relayed a story that the vizier of Bornu had lost forty slaves in a single night in Libya. A British account described happening upon an abandoned caravan surrounded by one hundred skeletons.

By 1858 the British consul in Tripoli had recorded that more than 66% of the value shipped across the Sahara was made up by slaves. The British Consul in Benghazi wrote in 1875 that the slave trade had reached an enormous scale and that the slaves who were sold in Alexandria and Constantinople had quadrupled in price. This trade, he wrote, was encouraged by the local government. By the mid 19th century it's possible that nearly 10,000 slaves were being transported to North Africa yearly. The Muslim historian Ahmad ibn Khalid an-Nasiri bemoaned the "unlimited enslavement of blacks" in 19th century North Africa "where men traffic them like beasts or worse" and where the majority of slaves were Muslims who should have been exempt from slavery because of their religious status.

Adolf Vischer wrote in an article published in 1911 that: "...it has been said that slave traffic is still going on on the Benghazi-Wadai route, but it is difficult to test the truth of such an assertion as, in any case, the traffic is carried on secretly". At Kufra, the Egyptian traveller Ahmed Hassanein Bey found out in 1916 that he could buy a girl slave for five pounds sterling while in 1923 he found that the price had risen to 30 to 40 pounds sterling. Another traveler, the Danish convert to Islam Knud Holmboe, crossed the Italian Libyan desert in 1930, and was told that slavery is still practiced in Kufra and that he could buy a slave girl for 30 pounds sterling at the Thursday slave market. According to James Richardson's testimony, when he visited Ghadames, most slaves were from Bornu. According to Raëd Bader, based on estimates of the Trans-Saharan trade, between 1700 and 1880 Tunisia received 100,000 black slaves, compared to only 65,000 entering Algeria, 400,000 in Libya, 515,000 in Morocco and 800,000 in Egypt.

Abolition 
After the establishment of the British and Foreign Anti-Slavery Society in 1839 to fight slave trading in the Mediterranean, Ahmad I ibn Mustafa, Bey of Tunis, agreed to outlaw exporting, importing, and selling slaves in 1842, and he made slavery illegal in 1846. In 1848, France outlawed slavery in Algeria. Slavery was not abolished in Mauritania until 1981.

Slavery in the post-Gaddafi Libya 
Since the United Nations-backed and NATO-led overthrow of Libyan leader Muammar Gaddafi's regime in 2011, Libya has been plagued by disorder and migrants with little cash and no papers have become vulnerable. Libya is a major exit point for African migrants heading to Europe. The International Organization for Migration (IOM) published a report in April 2017 showing that many of the migrants from West-Africa heading to Europe are sold as slaves after being detained by people smugglers or militia groups. African countries south of Libya were targeted for slave trading and transferred to Libyan slave markets instead. According to the victims, the price is higher for migrants with skills like painting and tiling. Slaves are often ransomed to their families and in the meantime until ransom can be tortured, forced to work, sometimes to death and eventually executed or left to starve if they can't pay for too long. Women are often raped and used as sex slaves and sold to brothels and private Libyan clients. Many child migrants also suffer from abuse and child rape in Libya.

After receiving unverified CNN video of a November 2017 slave auction in Libya, a human trafficker told Al-Jazeera (a Qatari TV station with interests in Libya) that hundreds of migrants are bought and sold across the country every week. Migrants who have gone through Libyan detention centres have shown signs of many human rights abuses such as severe abuse, including electric shocks, burns, lashes and even skinning, stated the director of health services on the Italian island of Lampedusa  to Euronews.

A Libyan group known as the Asma Boys have antagonized migrants from other parts of Africa from at least as early as 2000, destroying their property. Nigerian migrants in January 2018 gave accounts of abuses in detention centres, including being leased or sold as slaves. Videos of Sudanese migrants being burnt and whipped for ransom, were released later on by their families on social media. In June 2018, the United Nations applied sanctions against four Libyans (including a Coast Guard commander) and two Eritreans for their criminal leadership of slave trade networks.

Routes
According to professor Ibrahima Baba Kaké there were four main slavery routes to north Africa, from east to west of Africa, from the Maghreb to the Sudan, from Tripolitania to central Sudan and from Egypt to the Middle East. Caravan trails, set up in the 9th century, went past the oasis of the Sahara; travel was difficult and uncomfortable for reasons of climate and distance. Since Roman times, long convoys had transported slaves as well as all sorts of products to be used for barter.

Towns and ports involved

See also 

 Trans-Sahara Highway
 Trans-Saharan trade
Slavery in ancient Egypt
Slavery in ancient Rome
Slavery in Africa
Slavery in Libya
Human trafficking in Chad
Slavery in Mali
Slavery in Mauritania 
Slavery in Niger
Slavery in Nigeria

References

Further reading 

 The Garamantes and Trans-Saharan Enterprise in Classical Times

History of the Sahara
Trade routes
History of North Africa
African slave trade
Slavery in Asia
Slavery in Libya